Petasites japonicus, also known as butterbur, giant butterbur, great butterbur and sweet-coltsfoot, is an herbaceous perennial plant in the family Asteraceae. It is native to China, Japan, Korea and Sakhalin and introduced in Europe and North America.  It was introduced to southern British Columbia in Canada by Japanese migrants.

It is dioecious, with male and female flowers produced on separate individuals. Occasionally, morphologically hermaphroditic (but functionally sterile) flowers exist.

Uses
The shoot can be chopped and stir fried with miso to make fuki-miso which is eaten as a relish thinly spread over hot rice at meals. The bulb-like shoots are also picked fresh and fried as tempura. In Korea, it is steamed or boiled and then pressed to remove water. Sesame oil or perilla oil is added in order to make namul.

Toxicity 
Like other Petasites species, fuki contains pyrrolizidine alkaloids (PAs) which have been associated with cumulative damage to the liver and tumor formation.  It also contains the carcinogenic PA petasitenine.  The concentration of hepatotoxic PAs can be reduced to a concentration below detection limits with a proper extraction process.  Since many alkaloids are bitter, traditional methods of preparation may have evolved to remove them.

Animal studies
Certain extracts of Petasites japonicus have found to be anti-inflammatory in a study of asthma in mice. Based on additional studies in mice, the plant may contain blood plasma and hepatic lipid-lowering and antioxidant compounds.

Folklore

The Ainu people refer to the previous inhabitants of Ezo as the Korpokkur or "people who dwelt below ground"; the name can also be interpreted as "people beneath the fuki", and so they are popularly associated with fuki leaves in art and mythology. More fantastic depictions of the Korpokkur portray them as tiny, fairy-like creatures small enough to use the leaves as roofs or umbrellas.

References

External links
 
 
 
 Recipes from Yasuko-san's Home Cooking
 Traditional itazuri technique

Flora of Japan
Japanese cuisine
Perennial vegetables
japonicus
Plants used in traditional Chinese medicine
Plants described in 1866